Skeleton Cave is a cave in Maricopa County, Arizona, United States. The cave is within the Salt River Canyon Wilderness and is located on the northern wall of the Salt River Canyon near the Horse Mesa Dam. It was the site of the 1872 massacre of the Yavapai people in the Battle of Salt River Canyon.

It was listed on the National Register of Historic Places in 1991.

Background
A short distance from Canyon Lake, Skeleton Cave, also known as Apache Cave and Skull Cave, is a rock shelter formed by the overhang in the cliff wall.

The cave was used by the Yavapais as a hideout from George Crook and the 5th Cavalry. On December 28, 1872, Crook and his soldiers massacred the Yavapais. This was the first principal engagement during the 1872 Tonto Basin Campaign and part of the 1871 to 1875 Yavapai War. The 5th Cavalry left the more than seventy bodies of the victims in the cave. From the time of the 1872 massacre until about 1905, the cave remained forgotten.

In January 1908, local rancher Jack Adams visited the cave with a group of friends. The remains of the slain Yavapais were still in the cave along with remnants of their belongings, and this is how the cave acquired its name. After 1908, with the construction of local dams, the cave was rediscovered and subsequently looted. In 1933, the remains of the massacre victims were relocated to Fort McDowell.

The wilderness area around the cave is managed by the United States Forest Service. Accessing the cave requires a difficult hike.

Further reading

References

External links
 
 
 

Landforms of Maricopa County, Arizona
Caves of Arizona
National Register of Historic Places in Maricopa County, Arizona
Conflict sites on National Register of Historic Places in Arizona
Natural features on the National Register of Historic Places
Yavapai